Rolanda Chanel Bell (born 27 October 1987) is a female steeplechase runner from Panama.

Rolanda Bell coaches athletes privately  and trains with the NorCal Distance Project under Drew Wartenburg, alongside Olympian Kim Conley.

She was born in Queens, New York to a Panamanian father and an American mother.

Competition record

Personal bests
Outdoor
800 metres – 2:08.63 (Holmdel 2011)
1500 metres – 4:22.58 (Kingston 2011)
3000 metres steeplechase – 9:47.16 (New York City 2015)
Indoor
3000 metres – 9:18.37 (Boston 2016)

References

Living people
1987 births
Sportspeople from Queens, New York
Track and field athletes from New York City
People with acquired Panamanian citizenship
Panamanian female steeplechase runners
Panamanian female long-distance runners
Panamanian female middle-distance runners
American female steeplechase runners
American female long-distance runners
American female middle-distance runners
African-American female track and field athletes
Tennessee Volunteers women's track and field athletes
Pan American Games competitors for Panama
Athletes (track and field) at the 2015 Pan American Games
Athletes (track and field) at the 2019 Pan American Games
World Athletics Championships athletes for Panama
American sportspeople of Panamanian descent
Central American Games gold medalists for Panama
Central American Games medalists in athletics
Central American Games silver medalists for Panama
Central American Games bronze medalists for Panama
21st-century African-American sportspeople
21st-century African-American women
20th-century African-American people
20th-century African-American women